A Twenty20 International is an international cricket match between two representative teams. A Twenty20 International is played under the rules of Twenty20 cricket. In April 2018, the International Cricket Council (ICC) granted full international status to Twenty20 women's matches played between member sides from 1 July 2018 onwards. The West Indies women's team made its debut in T20I when it defeated Ireland in Dublin by 75 runs. As of December 2022, 46 women cricketers have played Twenty20 international for the West Indies. Six players have captained the team.

The West Indies women's cricket team is a multi-national cricket team that represents the West Indies (Antigua and Barbuda, Barbados, Dominica, Grenada, Guyana, Jamaica, Saint Lucia, Saint Vincent and the Grenadines, Trinidad and Tobago, parts of Saint Kitts and Nevis, Montserrat, British Virgin Islands, Sint Maarten and the US Virgin Islands).

The list comprises all members of the West Indies women's cricket team who have played at least one Twenty20 international match.

Key

List of players
Statistics are correct as of 19 February 2023.

List of captains

Notes

See also

List of West Indies women Test cricketers
List of West Indies women ODI cricketers

References

West Indies
 
Women Twenty20